"Like a Virgin" is a song recorded by American singer Madonna from her second album Like a Virgin (1984). The song was written and composed by Tom Kelly and Billy Steinberg, and it was released as the album's lead single on October 31, 1984. A dance song with two hooks, Madonna sings in a high register while a continuous arrangement of synths are heard along the bassline. The song's lyrics are ambiguous, consisting of hidden innuendos and open to various interpretations.

Upon release, "Like a Virgin" received positive reviews from music critics, who frequently singled out Madonna's vocals. It became her first number-one in the Billboard Hot 100, and topped the charts in Australia and Canada, while reaching the top ten elsewhere; "Like a Virgin" has sold over six million copies worldwide. The accompanying music video was directed by Mary Lambert, and showed Madonna sailing down the canals of Venice in a gondola, as well as roaming around a castle wearing a white wedding dress. The video received positive feedback; authors singled out the expression of Venetian vitality, and noted references to Saint Mark.

Madonna has performed "Like a Virgin" in seven of her concert tours, the last being 2015–2016's Rebel Heart Tour; the song's performance at the inaugural MTV Video Music Awards has been deemed a defining moment in pop culture, as well as one of the best performances in the show's history. "Like a Virgin" has been covered and parodied by a number of artists, including Elton John and "Weird Al" Yankovic. It's also been sung or referenced in feature films and TV shows such as Reservoir Dogs (1992), Moulin Rouge! (2001) and Glee (2010), among others. "Like a Virgin" has been recognized as one of Madonna's best songs, as well as the one that turned her into a superstar; "Like a Virgin" has also been credited with encouraging women and female performers from the time to embrace their sexuality.

Background

"Like a Virgin" was written by Billy Steinberg and Tom Kelly; the former had just begun a new relationship after a long rough period, and came up with the lyrics one day while driving a pickup truck around his father's vineyards in the Coachella Valley. Steinberg went on to reveal in an interview for the Los Angeles Times that the song was not written with a female singer in mind; it was inspired by how he coped with the difficult situation after ending a previous relationship. When he took the lyrics to Kelly, together they decided that it would be a sensitive ballad, but could not decide how to include the word "virgin" in it. Steinberg elaborated: "I wasn't just trying to get that racy word virgin in a lyric. I was saying [...] I've been battered romantically and emotionally like many people— but I'm starting a new relationship and it just feels so good, it's healing all the wounds and making me feel like I've never done this before". They then recorded a demo, with Kelly singing lead and Steinberg singing backup.

After the demo was recorded, Kelly invited Warner Bros. Records A&R executive Michael Ostin to his house to listen to it. Ostin, who was set to meet with Madonna the following day, wanted to play the demo for her, as he believed the lyrics and groove were "perfect" for her; "when I played it [for Madonna] she went crazy, and I knew instantly it was a song for her and that she could make a great record out of it," Ostin recalled. In a 2009 interview with Rolling Stone, the singer was asked by Austin Scaggs what were her first impressions  after listening to the demos of "Like a Virgin" and "Material Girl"; she replied,
I liked them both because they were ironic and provocative at the same time but also unlike me. I am not a materialistic person, and I certainly wasn't a virgin, and, by the way, how can you be like a virgin? I liked the play on words; I thought they were clever. They're so geeky, they're cool. I never realized they would become my signature songs, especially the second one.

Recording and production 

In mid-1984, Madonna met with Nile Rodgers at New York's Power Station studio to start working on her second studio album; Rodgers put together an "economical" rhythm section, consisting of himself on guitars, Bernard Edwards from Chic on bass, and Tony Thompson on drums. According to author Fred Bronson, Rodgers did not want Madonna to record "Like a Virgin", as he felt the lyric "like a virgin" was not a "terrific" hook, nor an "all-time catch phrase". However, he began to have second thoughts after hearing the demo; "I couldn't get it out of my head after I played it, even though I didn't really like it [...] but it grew on me. I really started to like it. [...] But, my first reaction to it was, 'This is really queer'", Rodgers recalled.  The producer then "handed [my] apology [to Madonna] and said, 'you know... if it's so catchy that it stayed in my head for four days, it must be something. So let's do it", thus the song was finally recorded. Madonna was very eager to release her work with Rodgers, despite "Borderline" being a top-ten hit at the time; "not that I didn't love Reggie Lucas and 'Borderline' [...] but the thing is, when I put out my first record it didn't really do that well. [...] So it kind of had a resurgence right at the time we were going to release 'Like a Virgin'", she recalled. Of the recording process, Billy Steinberg commented:
When Madonna recorded it, even as our demo faded out, on the fade you could hear Tom saying, "When your heart beats, and you hold me, and you love me..." That was the last thing you heard as our demo faded. [She] must have listened to it very, very carefully because her record ends with the exact same little ad-libs that our demo did. That rarely happens that someone studies your demo so carefully that they use all that stuff. We were sort of flattered how carefully she followed our demo on that.
Jason Corsaro, the record's audio engineer, persuaded Rodgers to use digital recording, a new technique at the time which Corsaro believed was going to be the "future" of recording because test pressings always sounded consistent. To ensure this, Corsaro used a Sony 3324 24-track DASH recorder, and a Sony F1 PCM adaptor for the stereo mix; Madonna recorded her vocals inside a small, wooden, high-ceilinged piano room at the back of Studio C, also known as Power Station's "R&B room". Corsaro then placed gobos around her while using the top capsule of a stereo AKG C24 tube microphone, with a Schoeps microphone preamplifier and a Pultec equalizer; "that was part of the Power Station way — nothing was subtle and everything had a particular sound", the engineer recalled. Once the track was approved, Robert Sabino added the keyboard parts, playing mostly a Sequential Circuits Prophet-5, as well as some Rhodes piano and acoustic piano; Rodgers also played a Synclavier. Madonna, although not required, was present every minute of the recording sessions and the mixing process, Corsaro commented: "Nile was there most of the time, but she was there all of the time. She never left".

Composition and lyrics 

Composed as a dance-oriented song, the intro of "Like a Virgin" consists of two hooks. According to the sheet music published by Alfred Publishing Inc., it is written in common time, with a moderately groove tempo of 118 beats per minute; Madonna's vocals range from the tonal nodes of low-tone G3 to high-tone C5. Rikky Rooksby wrote in The Complete Guide to the Music of Madonna (2004) that the bassline on the intro is a re-working of the three-note bass motif present in the Four Tops' "I Can't Help Myself (Sugar Pie Honey Bunch)" (1965), where Chuck Berry provided the chord arrangement. The bassline shares similarities with Michael Jackson's "Billie Jean" (1983), especially during the second verse. Madonna sings in her high register, while drum arrangement by Tony Thompson can heard alongside the bassline; this is supported by a synthesizer arrangement, giving it a circular progression through all the seven diatonic chords of I–IV–viio–iii–vi–ii–V–I. In the second chorus, the singer exclaims the title phrase, followed by a Hey! sung in falsetto; the outro has "breathless" ad-libs such as "can't you hear my heart beat... for the very first time?".

Lyrically, "Like a Virgin" has been described as an "ode to a lover who makes the singer feel like new". Madonna commented: "I like innuendo, I like irony, I like the way things can be taken on different levels"; this statement highlighted the ambiguity of the lyrics of the song, which is hung on the word "like". According to Rooksby, the song can be interpreted in many different ways: actual virgins are encouraged to hold their compose before their first sexual encounter; in the case of men and more sexually experienced women, however, the lyrics talk about how they can re-live the feelings of their first sexual encounter.

Release and critical reception 
"Like a Virgin" was released as the album's lead single on October 31, 1984. Rodgers wanted "Material Girl" to be released as lead single but "Like a Virgin" was chosen instead, a decision Madonna herself found "quite controversial". Afterwards, the song was included on the singer's compilations, The Immaculate Collection (1990), and Celebration (2009). Upon release, "Like a Virgin" was met with generally positive reviews from music critics. On his biography of the singer, J. Randy Taraborrelli described it as a "coy song that suggested [she] really was a virgin - excited, sexy and willing". Author Thomas J. Ferraro called it "hilariously tongue-in-cheek". In The History of American Pop, Stuart A. Kallen referred to it as "light and catchy, easy to dance to, and just plain fun". From AllMusic, Stephen Thomas Erlewine named it, along with "Material Girl", one of the album's "definitive statements" that "overshadow" the rest of the songs; Stewart Mason from the same website, felt it was "pure bubblegum fluff" and the song in which Madonna "sounds most like Marilyn Monroe". Rolling Stones Debby Miller deemed it "terrific", and opined that, despite her "little-girl voice [...] when she chirps, 'You made me feel/Shiny and new/Like a virgin', [...] you know she's after something". The same magazine then said that, "even if the word 'virgin' is the only sexual reference in the lyrics, ['Like a Virgin'] still sounds saturated in lust". From Billboard, Brian Chin praised the singer's "flawlessly phrased, witty" vocals and referred to the song as her "most pop-oriented cut yet". Kenneth Partridge, also writing for Billboard, compared it to "Billie Jean" and referred to it as a "complex song about purity and sex". Parades Samuel Murrian singled out "just how clever and skillfully constructed this song is".

The staff of Cash box opined that, "though the hooks are not as interesting as on her previous singles, Madonna's voice is in full force". While Yahoo!'s Nicole Hogsett said it was a "flirtatious, innocent-sounding (yet not innocent at all) [...] undeniably fun discussion of love", The Guardian called it "saucy". Amy Davidson from Digital Spy praised its "instantly memorable" lyrics, and said it had "one of the best basslines in pop".  For The Arizona Republic, Ed Masley wrote that, "['Like a Virgin'] features young Madonna at her chirpiest" and, when compared to other singles such as "Justify My Love" (1990), it "does feel pretty virginal". Stereogums Tom Breihan pointed out that "Rodgers' production and the Chic members' playing is sharp and in-the-pocket [...] [Madonna] projects personality all over it. But she also sounds tinny and small", ultimately concluding that it was a "pretty good" song. In less favorable reviews, Entertainment Weeklys Dave Karger felt it came off a bit repetitious and immature. The Backlot's Louis Virtel opined it's the Madonna song that has "aged [the] worst and most" since its release. Sal Cinquemani from Slant Magazine dismissed "Like a Virgin" as a novelty.

Commercial performance 

On November 17, 1984, "Like a Virgin" debuted at number 48 of the Billboard Hot 100, and was the week's most added song to radio stations. One week later, the single entered the Dance Club Songs chart at number 26. On December 15, following the release of the Like a Virgin album, the song reached the Dance chart's first position, giving Madonna her second number one there after the "Holiday"/"Lucky Star" release from October 1983. Additionally, it was the sixth Dance Club number one produced by Nile Rodgers. After six weeks on the chart, "Like a Virgin" reached the Hot 100's top spot on December 22, tying Prince's "When Doves Cry" as the fastest-rising number one single of the year. With this feat, Madonna became the year's fourth female artist to top the Hot 100, following Deniece Williams, Cyndi Lauper and Tina Turner; "Like a Virgin" was the second number one by an act from Sire Records ―the other being "Pop Muzik" (1979) by M.

On January 10, 1985, the song was certified gold by the Recording Industry Association of America (RIAA) for shipping a million copies across the United States. Nine days later, after having spent five consecutive weeks on the Hot 100's first spot, "Like a Virgin" became the longest running number one for a female since "Flashdance... What a Feeling" (1983) by Irene Cara; it spent a total of six consecutive weeks at number one. "Like a Virgin" was also Madonna's first top-ten entry on the Hot R&B/Hip-Hop Songs chart, peaking at 9. On Billboard Hot 100 year-end chart for 1985, "Like a Virgin" was placed at placed at two; on the Dance Club Songs year-end chart, it peaked at number three.

In Canada, the single debuted in the 71st position of RPMs Top Singles chart on the week of November 24, 1984; it reached the top spot on January 19, 1985 and was ranked 35 on the magazine's 1985 year-end chart. In the United Kingdom, "Like a Virgin" debuted at number 51 on the UK Singles Chart on November 17, 1984, and reached the third position almost two months later; it spent two weeks at number three, and eighteen on the chart overall. It was the fourth best-selling song of 1984 in the United Kingdom, and was certified gold by the British Phonographic Industry (BPI) for shipment of 500,000 copies. According to Music Week magazine, over 768,129 copies of the single have been sold as of 2008. In Australia, "Like a Virgin" became Madonna's first number one song on the Kent Music Report chart; in New Zealand, it entered the charts on December 9, 1984, and peaked at number two, remaining on that spot for two weeks. "Like a Virgin" proved to be a success across Europe as well, peaking within the top ten of the charts of Austria, Belgium, France, Germany, Ireland, Netherlands, Norway and Switzerland. It came in at number one on the European Hot 100 Singles chart. It was less successful in Japan, where it barely reached the top 20. According to Italian newspaper Corriere della Sera, "Like a Virgin" has sold over six million copies worldwide.

Music video

Background and synopsis 

The music video for "Like a Virgin" was directed by Mary Lambert, who had previously worked with Madonna on "Borderline"; it was filmed on location in Venice and New York at a cost of $150,000, "way more than we'd ever spent on a video" according to Warner Bros. creative director Jeff Ayeroff. Shooting in Venice was Lambert's idea, as "[Madonna] singing in a gondola was the most outrageous thing I could think of". The visual interspersed footage of the singer as "a knowing virgin", dressed in a white wedding dress, with scenes of her "strutting" throughout Venice in a "sluttish getup". Also present are a male lion wandering through the streets, and a man in a lion's mask. Madonna herself explained the concept: "[Mary] wanted me to be the modern-day, worldly-wise girl that I am. But then we wanted to go back in time and use myself as an actual virgin"; she also recalled that, at one point, she was "leaning against this pillar with [the lion's] head in my crotch [...] I thought he was going to take a bite out of me".

It begins with Madonna getting off a boat at the Brooklyn Bridge. The setting then moves to Venice, where a "flirtatious" Madonna watches the lion walk through the streets; she then walks to the beat of the music. Later on, the singer is seen walking through a "fairytale castle" dressed in a "virginal" white wedding gown. These scene are interspersed with shots of Madonna dancing suggestively on a gondola. Towards the end, the singer meets a man wearing a lion mask who carries her into a bed. In the final shot, the couple rides off together in a gondola, and the video ends with the New York skyline.

"Like a Virgin" was added to MTV on the week of November 10, 1984. In 1986, the song's performance from the Madonna Live: The Virgin Tour release was published as a video and nominated for Best Choreography at the MTV Video Music Awards. Five years later, the performance from the Madonna: Truth or Dare documentary was also released as a music video and received nominations at the 1991 MTV Video Music Awards. The official video can be found on Madonna's video compilations The Immaculate Collection (1990), and Celebration: The Video Collection (2009).

Reception and analysis 
The video was generally well received by critics. For The Independent, Ben Kelly pointed out that, "her ambition is on full display [on the video]. As the camera cuts between her eyes and those of a lion, it's hard to tell who looks hungrier"; he named it one of Madonna's ten best music videos. "Like a Virgin" was considered the singer's eighth best video by Idolators Mike Neid, who referred to it as a "timeless release". Louis Virtel placed it in the 27th position of The Backlot's ranking of the singer's music videos. Ferraro called it "funny, funky and bright". Georges-Claude Guilbert, in Madonna as Postmodern Myth (2015), highlighted the "games with carnival masks, men, lions and 'werelions', [and] allusions to eighteenth-century practices", adding that it was an "extremely sexy" clip. Author Michael Campbell concluded that with the video, Madonna created "the formula that would set the tone for her subsequent work: combine provocative, shocking and controversial themes and images with bright, accessible music".

Author Margaret Plant noted the expression of Venetian vitality in the video, writing that "old sacrosanct Venice was propelled into a pop world of high-energy gyration, and endless circulation". Tom Bromley wrote that the lion represented Saint Mark, the patron saint of Venice; Plant also noted references to Saint Mark, adding that Madonna appeared to "stretch the boundaries of tolerance in the video", since Saint Mark represented a time in Venice when acts such as homosexuality and fornication were a capital offense. Plant also wrote that the scene in which the masked man carries Madonna, symbolized an instance of the Saint taking the simulated Virgin: Madonna became a symbol for La Serenissima, the Republic itself. Andrew Greeley opined that the video "celebrates a powerful erotic fantasy", finding parallels to "the way we are in the presence of God [...] Is not the gentle care in which [Madonna's] lover treats her the way God alleges that he treats us?".

Live performances

1984 MTV Video Music Awards 
On September 14, 1984, Madonna opened the inaugural MTV Video Music Awards ceremony with "Like a Virgin"; she initially wanted to perform with a full-grown Bengal tiger, but this idea was quickly nixed. Instead, she emerged from a 17-foot wedding cake, donning a white wedding dress with a bustier, pearls, rosaries, lace fingerless gloves, and a belt with a buckle that read "Boy Toy". During the number, she slithered and writhed across the floor, with her dress going up and her underpants showing. The singer explained that this was not intentional, as one of her shoes had come off at the beginning and she simply had tried to reach for it; "I thought, 'Well, I'll just pretend I meant to do this,' and I dove on the floor and I rolled around", she later recalled.

MTV's Jessie Peterson opined that the performance put Madonna "on the map as Queen of Pop Music", and established the VMAs as "the place where water-cooler moments happen". Ian Anglis, on Performance and Popular Music: History, Place and Time, saw the performance as Madonna's "coming-out party", further adding that it gave MTV  "legitimacy when [it was trying] - by the roundabout means of award ceremonies and live music - to convince the world [...] of the worthiness of music video".

For Courtney E. Smith, "although Cyndi Lauper took home the Moon Man for Best female video, [Madonna] made 1984 all about the 'Blonde ambition' [...] The act she put on that night convinced a lot of us that we shouldn't just buy in to her image, but that we wanted to [...] run out and buy a copy of her second album". Similarly, Tom Breihan pointed out that many of the performers and presenters were already established figures: Rod Stewart, Huey Lewis And The News, and David Bowie among others, yet, "all anyone remembers is Madonna singing 'Like A Virgin' in public for the very first time". For the staff of Rolling Stone, it's a moment in pop culture "as indelible as the Beatles on Ed Sullivan". It was named one of the best performances in the show's history by Slant Magazine and Billboard, with the singer's bridal look considered one of her most memorable and iconic.

Other performances 

On May 16, 1984, Madonna performed "Like a Virgin" at artist Keith Haring's birthday party, which took place on New York's Paradise Garage; she wore a leather jacket personally painted by the artist, and sang on a brass bed covered with frilly material and strewn with white roses. It was also sung on promotional television appearances throughout late 1984 and early 1985. Furthermore, "Like a Virgin" has been performed on seven of Madonna's concert tours: Virgin (1985), Who's That Girl (1987), Blond Ambition (1990), The Girlie Show (1993), Confessions (2006), MDNA (2012), and Rebel Heart (2015―2016). On the first one, Madonna once again wore a white wedding dress and asked the audience if they wanted to marry her; she would then thrust her hips at their affirmative response, and sang a few lines from "Billie Jean". On his review of one of the San Diego concerts, Robert Hilburn felt the singer was "at her best when working off an idea or concept", citing the song's performance as an example. The performance was included in the VHS release Madonna Live: The Virgin Tour, recorded in Detroit, Michigan. For 1987's Who's That Girl World Tour, the song was performed in a medley with "Material Girl" and "Dress You Up"; Madonna changed her clothes in an onstage telephone booth and emerged wearing a dress covered in toys, trinkets and other plastic paraphernalia. Halfway through, she bent over to revel a pair of lace panties, which she then threw into the crowd, and sang a fragment of "I Can't Help Myself (Sugar Pie Honey Bunch)". Towards the end, she was joined by a young male dancer who acted as a bridegroom. The number was deemed one of the concert's strongest by the Washington Posts Richard Harrington. Two different performances can be found on the videos Who's That Girl: Live in Japan, filmed in Tokyo on June, and Ciao Italia: Live from Italy, filmed in Turin on September.

On the Blond Ambition World Tour of 1990, Madonna sang a slowed version of the song with a Middle East theme. She wore a gold metallic corset with conical cups, designed by Jean Paul Gaultier, and sang on top of a red velvet bed flanked by two male dancers, also in conical brassieres. As the artist sang, she humped the bed and pretended to masturbate, while the dancers caressed her body and stroked their own brassieres. Greg Kot from the Chicago Tribune singled out the performance for being "both seductive and hilarious", while Richard Harrington said it was the concert's "only clear miscalculation, probably meant to shock, but [was] only distressing". Three different performances can be found in Blond Ambition Japan Tour 90, taped in Yokohama, Blond Ambition World Tour Live, taped in Nice, and in the documentary Madonna: Truth or Dare. In Toronto, Canada, police threatened to arrest Madonna on obscenity charges, if she didn't alter the performance's masturbation sequence; the show went unaltered, and the singer later issued a statement saying she was willing to be arrested to protect her freedom to "express myself as an artist". The incident was referenced and can be seen in Madonna: Truth or Dare. The song's performance on The Girlie Show (1993) took place in a Berlin cabaret setting; Madonna sang in a heavy German accent, pronouncing the word "Virgin" as "Wurgin", dressed in a look similar to that of Marlene Dietrich in the 1930 film Morocco, consisting of top hat and tails. Guilbert highlighted the singer's "funny" accent during the number.   The performance recorded on November 19, 1993, at the Sydney Cricket Ground, was included on The Girlie Show: Live Down Under home video release (1994).

In April 2003, while promoting her ninth studio album American Life, Madonna did an impromptu acoustic rendition of "Like a Virgin" at New York's Tower Records. That same year, a medley of "Like a Virgin" and "Hollywood" ―from American Life― was performed by Madonna, Britney Spears and Christina Aguilera during the MTV Video Music Awards. It began with Spears, dressed in a white wedding gown, emerging from a giant wedding cake ―a reference to Madonna's 1984 performance―, singing the song's first verse; then, a dark-haired Aguilera, also in bridal gear, began to sing the chorus. Madonna took the stage dressed as groom with black top hat and tuxedo, and began singing "Hollywood". The three women danced together across the stage, before ending the performance with two open mouth kisses. Sal Cinquemani opined that "[Madonna] rarely shares the stage with other stars, and for it to be Britney and Christina [...] was nothing short of surreal"; according to Glamours Christopher Rosa, it was an "important moment in our nation's history", that "spawned an entire generation of gay men". On the Confessions Tour, Madonna, dressed in a "dominatrix equestrian" outfit, sang "Like a Virgin" on top of a black saddle as the backdrops flashed X-ray radiographies of the injuries she suffered on a horse-riding accident. The number was positively received by Liz Smith for the Baltimore Sun, who named it one of the concert's best. The performance from the August 15–16 London concerts was included on the singer's second live album The Confessions Tour (2007).

On the Rome stop of 2008's Sticky & Sweet Tour, Madonna dedicated "Like a Virgin" to Pope Benedict XVI; she also did a capella renditions of the track on the Vancouver, Okland, and Buenos Aires concerts per the crowd's request; one of these performances was included on the Sticky & Sweet Tour live album release (2010). For 2012's The MDNA Tour, Madonna reworked "Like a Virgin" into a "gothic waltz", which she sang in bra and panties, backed by a piano player wearing a top hat. Halfway through, a male dancer put a corset around her waist and tightened the strings until she couldn't sing anymore. For The Kansas City Star, Timothy Finn compared the rendition to the work of Leonard Cohen; according to Scott Marvis from the Pittsburgh Post-Gazette, the number saw Madonna singing in "her most seductive vocal".  The performance of the song at the November 19–20, 2012 shows in Miami, at the American Airlines Arena, were recorded and released in the singer's fourth live album, MDNA World Tour (2013). A remix of the song with a "pulsing industrial beat" was created by French producer Denis Zabee, and performed by the singer on her Rebel Heart Tour (2015―2016); Madonna danced alone on the stage, doing moves similar to Michael Jackson's and, at one point, opened her blouse to show off her lingerie and cleavage. The number was positively received by Alex Needham from The Guardian, who pointed out that Madonna sang the track "with all the allure and aggression with which she infused it when it was first released". The New York Daily News Jim Farber felt the singer danced "with a freedom and innocence that made her, at 57, seem once again new". The song's performance at the March 19–20, 2016 shows in Sydney's Allphones Arena was recorded and released on Madonna's fifth live album, Rebel Heart Tour (2017).

Cover versions and usage 

In 1985, The Lords of the New Church covered "Like a Virgin" for their compilation album Killer Lords; AllMusic's Gary Hill singled out the "funny and obnoxious" rendition. That same year, "Weird Al" Yankovic recorded "Like a Surgeon", a parody of the song, for his album Dare to Be Stupid; an acquaintance of Madonna, who happened to be friends with Yankovic's manager, suggested the idea, noting that it would not take long for Yankovic to satirize the song. The track received positive reviews, with AllMusic's Eugene Chadbourne deeming it "perhaps his best parody ever". "Like a Surgeon" peaked at number 47 of the Billboard Hot 100. Six years later, Scottish band Teenage Fanclub included a rendition of "Like a Virgin" on The King (1991), their second studio album.

In 2002, French–Dutch group Mad'House did a Eurodance take on the song, that was included on their album Absolutely Mad. "The Madonna Trilogy", a mashup of "Like a Virgin", "Lucky Star" and "Burning Up", was recorded by The Meat Purveyors. At the 2008 MTV Video Music Awards, Katy Perry performed "Like a Virgin" alongside Travis Barker and DJ AM. Doda included "Like a Virgin" in the 2009 re-edition of her album Diamond Bitch. Elton John sang the track at the 2010 Rock for the Rainforest concert. 2NE1 recorded the song for their album Collection (2012); that same year, JoJo sang it at a Harvard-Westlake School charity held at LACMA, and Peruvian singer Wendy Sulca recorded a spanglish version. In 2014, Cristina Scuccia, a nun who won that year's The Voice of Italy season, released a ballad rendition of the song as her debut single; Madonna herself praised Succia. Romanian singer Alexandra Stan recorded version the song with a new orchestration done by Chris Trace in late January 2017; In 2019, Big & Rich did a rendition of the song with an altered melody; that same year, Mötley Crüe covered the song for the soundtrack of The Dirt.

In 1985, Max Baer Jr. approached Kelly and Steinberg with a proposal to turn the song into a film, just as he had done with Ode to Billy Joe (1970), and even began negotiations with them. However, the ABC threatened to sue after hearing of the negotiations; lawyers claimed the songwriters had already agreed to sell the rights to the network for a television film. Baer subsequently sued ABC for interfering with his prospective economic advantage, and was awarded $2 million by a court, who agreed that the network had wrongly interfered with the producer's plans. During the opening scene of Quentin Tarantino's 1992 film Reservoir Dogs, the character Mr. Brown (played by Tarantino himself) insists that "Like a Virgin" is "about a girl who meets a guy with a big dick"; when Madonna met Tarantino at a party after the film's release, she gave him an autographed copy of her album Erotica, signing, "Quentin: it's about love, not dick". In Baz Luhrmann's Moulin Rouge! (2001), "Like a Virgin" was turned into a "delightful comic number" performed by Jim Broadbent. A sing-along of the track was performed by the titular character (Renée Zellweger) and a group of prostitutes at a Thailand jail in the 2004 film Bridget Jones: The Edge of Reason; four years later, in "The Becoming", the fourteenth episode of the fourth season of American medical drama Grey's Anatomy, Cristina Yang (Sandra Oh) hums the song while she removes the hearts of 50 cadavers. It was namechecked in the Train's "Hey, Soul Sister" (2009) with the lyric "I believe in you/Like a virgin you're Madonna". In "The Power of Madonna" (2010), fifteenth episode of American television series Glee, "Like a Virgin" was sung by three couples played by Jonathan Groff, Jayma Mays, Lea Michele, Cory Monteith, Matthew Morrison, and Naya Rivera; the performance was praised by Entertainment Weeklys Tim Stack, who hailed it as "one of the more ambitious numbers of the night".

Legacy

Recognition 

"Like a Virgin" has been recognized as one of Madonna's best songs, as well as the one that turned her into a superstar. Samuel Murrian named it the singer's third greatest song, that marked "the moment she went from being a big star to being an icon". It was also named her third best by Gay Star News Joe Morgan. PopMatterss Enio Chola added that, "when ['Like a Virgin'] hit, [Madonna's] status was elevated to that of pop culture icon. [...] [it's] the song that defined for us who Madonna was (at the time) and would be turning into (in the near future)". Harrison Brocklehurst for The Tab referred to the song as one that "defined the genre"; he named "Like a Virgin" the singer's 18th best single. Sal Cinquemani named it "iconic", as well as "the first—if not the—signature song of her career".

Entertainment Weeklys Chuck Arnold named it the second best song of Madonna's catalogue, as well as one of the best songs from the 1980s decade; a similar opinion was shared by Andrew Unterberger from Billboard, who named it one of the decade's "defining" tracks, and the singer's 10th best. Writing for Consequence, Allison Franks and Michael Roffman said it would always remain a "cultural artifact of the 1980s". Mike Wass from Idolator named it "one of the most iconic pop songs of all time". Matthew Jacobs added that it was the singer's most famous song, as well as a "staple at wedding receptions, on the airwaves and on lists of controversial moments in popular culture". Nicole Hogsett deemed it an "undeniable classic". "Like a Virgin" is one of the songs that "have come to define our times, influenced trends and triggered change in politics and culture", discussed in the 2003 documentary Impact: Songs That Changed The World.

Cultural impact 

On an article celebrating the Like a Virgin album's 35th anniversary, John Murph noted that "white conservatives" made "a nationwide fuss" following the single's release. Family organizations criticized it, as they believed it promoted sex outside marriage and "undermined" family values, while others sought to ban it along with the music video. Despite its not being included on its "Filthy Fifteen" list, it has been argued that "Like a Virgin" is one of the songs that led to the creation of the Parents Music Resource Center in 1985. Benjamin Brand and David J. Rothenberg wrote in Music and Culture in the Middle Ages and Beyond: Liturgy, Sources, Symbolism (2016), that the song's lyrics, specifically the word "virgin", "seemed to violate a respected - if not revered - state in 1984, both in the physiological and Christological sense of the word". Carol Clerk noted that the song attracted an "unprecedented level of attention from social groups", something uncommon for a female singer; the author believed the public listened "superficially" to the lyrics, thus believed that they detailed or called on an "innocent's sexual initiation". She concluded by saying that, while one section of the population was outraged, others were taking joy at the "very notion of a virginal Madonna". The singer herself said she was surprised at the public's reaction; "everyone interpreted it as 'I don't want to be a virgin anymore. Fuck my brains out!'. That's not what I sang at all. 'Like a Virgin' was always absolutely ambiguous", she explained.

The term "Madonna wannabe" was created to describe the thousands of girls who tried to emulate Madonna's style; both Adam Sexton and William McKeen noted that most of the singer's admirers were young girls raised with an image of old-fashioned female stereotypes, and saw in the artist a role model, someone who "injects middle-class ideas of femininity with examples of what feminism means to her [...] equal opportunity". Madonna became the "last word in attitude and fashion. The epitome of cool". Enio Chola concluded that with the song, "[Madonna]  became a liberating mainstream sexual force"; author Debbi Voller added that "Like a Virgin" gave rise to "the icon Madonna". According to Chuck Arnold, "Like a Virgin" paved the way for female artists to "unapologetically explore the sexual wilderness", adding that "no one had to act like a virgin anymore" following its release. On the same vein, Thomas Harrison wrote that the "sexually charged" imagery of the song and its video, encouraged other female performers to embrace their own sexuality. For HuffPost, Caroline Sullivan pointed out that before Madonna, no other female singer had ever "shoehorned the subject virginity into a pop song so bluntly, or made it clear that no matter what you were - virgin or sexually experienced - it was absolutely fine". A similar opinion was shared by Jude Rogers from The Guardian, who claimed that until Madonna emerged, "the V-word" wasn't used by female singers "unless they were singing Christmas carols". Outs Nathan Smith gave a detailed analysis:
From a contextual perspective, another appeal of 'Like A Virgin' was the way it reconstituted sex in mainstream music within discourses of religion and innocence. In a decade plagued by mass hysteria because of the HIV/AIDS crisis, and the way sex (for both heterosexual and homosexual couples) was characterized by illness, viral exchanges, and the threat of 'contamination'. Madonna's song moved away from discussing the seemingly abject nature of sex, in an epoch so preoccupied by the dangers of sex and illness. 'Like A Virgin' told women that they could be in charge of their erotic agendas, could, should, and would enjoy their sexual escapades, and did not even have to be virgins to do so. (Maybe just act a little virginal?)

Track listings and formats 

 US 7-inch single
 "Like a Virgin" – 3:38
 "Stay" – 4:04

 US and Canadian 12-inch maxi single
 "Like a Virgin" (extended dance remix) – 6:04
 "Stay" – 4:04

German and UK CD maxi single (1995)
 "Like a Virgin" (extended dance remix) – 6:04
 "Stay" – 4:04

Personnel 
 Madonna – vocals
 Rob Sabino – synthesizers, synth bass
 Nile Rodgers – guitars, drum programming
 Bernard Edwards – bass
 Tony Thompson – drums

Production credits
 Tom Kelly – songwriter
 Billy Steinberg – songwriter
 Nile Rodgers – producer
 Jellybean Benitez – 12-inch remixer
 Larry Williams – photography (12-inch cover art)

Credits adapted from the album and the 12-inch single liner notes.

Charts

Weekly charts

Year end charts

All-time charts

Certifications and sales 

!scope="col" colspan="3"| Digital
|-

References

Bibliography

External links 
 

1984 singles
1984 songs
Billboard Hot 100 number-one singles
Cashbox number-one singles
Madonna songs
Mötley Crüe songs
Music videos directed by Mary Lambert
Number-one singles in Australia
Oricon International Singles Chart number-one singles
RPM Top Singles number-one singles
Sire Records singles
Song recordings produced by Nile Rodgers
Songs written by Billy Steinberg
Songs written by Tom Kelly (musician)
Warner Records singles
Music videos shot in Venice
Novelty songs